Archibald Thorburn FZS (31 May 1860, Lasswade, Midlothian – 9 October 1935, Hascombe, Surrey)  was a Scottish artist who specialised in wildlife, painting mostly in watercolour. He regularly visited Scotland to sketch birds in the wild, his favourite haunt being the Forest of Gaick near Kingussie in Invernesshire. His widely reproduced images of British wildlife, with their evocative and dramatic backgrounds, are enjoyed as much today as they were by naturalists a century ago.

Life and work

Archibald was born at Viewfield House, Lasswade, Midlothian, the fifth son of Robert Thorburn (1818–1885), portrait miniaturist to Queen Victoria. His first education was at Dalkeith and in Edinburgh, after which he was sent to the newly founded St John's Wood School of Art in London. His stay there was only brief, since on the death of his father he sought the guidance of Joseph Wolf. It was his commission in 1887 to illustrate Lord Lilford's Coloured Figures of the Birds of the British Isles, for which he painted some 268 watercolours, that established his reputation. He illustrated numerous sporting and natural history books, including his own. He taught Otto Murray Dixon and Philip Rickman (both in Nature in Art's collection), and he encouraged the young Donald Watson when he came to visit him in Dumfries and Galloway. Thorburn was friends of other eminent bird illustrators including George Edward Lodge and John Guille Millais with whom he collaborated on a number of works including: Natural History of British Feeding Ducks; British Diving Ducks and British Game Birds.

His paintings were regularly exhibited at the Royal Academy and he designed their first Christmas card for the Royal Society for the Protection of Birds in 1899, a practice that he continued until 1935. He was Vice-President of the Royal Society for the Protection of Birds. In the 1890s Thorburn became disheartened by the British Institution and had his work shown at A. Baird Carter of 70 Jermyn Street.

On his marriage to Constance Mudie, Thorburn moved to High Leybourne in Hascombe in 1902, where he was to spend the rest of his life. In the 1930s he refused to make use of electric lighting, preferring natural light for his painting, and making use of lamps and candles. His grave is at St John the Baptist church in Busbridge, Godalming.

Books illustrated

1882 Sketches of Bird Life - J E Harting
1883–88 Familiar Wild Birds - W.F. Swaysland (a Sussex naturalist and taxidermist), 144 plates, 4 volumes
1885–97 Coloured Figures of the Birds of the British Isles - Lord Lilford, 268 watercolours, 7 volumes
1895 Ornithology of the Straits of Gibraltar by Leonard Howard Loyd Irby
1896 The Deer Forests of Scotland by Arthur Grimble, 8 plates
1915-16 British Birds - 4 volumes
1920 British Mammals
1920–25 The Birds of the British Isles and their eggs - Thomas Coward
1937 Observer Book of British Birds
1997 The Complete Illustrated Thorburn's Birds - Wordsworth Editions Ltd., 
Thorburn's mammals - text by Gordon Corbet, Wordsworth Editions Ltd.,

See also
List of wildlife artists
Eliza Turck (1832–1891), who also produced many illustrations for the 1883 edition of "Familiar Wild Birds".

References

External links

 
 Birds by Archibald Thorburn - Examples at 'Fine Rare Prints'.
Oiseaux
Illustrations by Archibald Thorburn in Flickr Commons
Thorburn's Cats

1860 births
1935 deaths
Scottish illustrators
Fellows of the Zoological Society of London
Scottish watercolourists
People from Midlothian
Scottish ornithologists
British bird artists
19th-century Scottish painters
Scottish male painters
20th-century Scottish painters
19th-century Scottish male artists
20th-century Scottish male artists